Metal Ware Corporation is a company located in Two Rivers, Wisconsin and manufactures small kitchen appliances primarily marketing them under the NESCO and American Harvest brand names.

History

1927-1940 
Metal Ware Corporation was co-founded by Joseph Koenig, who also founded the Mirro Aluminum Company and William H Ellis II.  Metal Ware filed for incorporation on August 18, 1920.   The company was a successor to Two Rivers Plating which was founded by Henry Mixa in 1902. In October, 1920, property was purchased from Two River Plating and Manufacturing Company. The company's primary products were copper and nickel-plated utensils.

The 1920s saw growth in the company with employment reaching 100 by 1927. A popular product of the company was a full feature miniature stove measuring 21 inches wide, 17 inches high and only 10 inches deep.  It was particularly popular with apartment dwellers.  Metal Ware announced an agreement with Westinghouse Electric and Manufacturing Co. to sell these compact stoves.  They also announced a contract with General Electric to handle their stoves for export trade.

In addition to several different sizes of electric ranges, they were also producing electric percolators and educational toys including an electric power 'steam' engine.  In the first seven years of existence, the company grew enough that they were advertising that they were the 'Worlds Biggest Electrical Toy Factory".

In 1928, Metal Ware introduced a new style of sandwich toaster with an expandable hinge and was designed to toast both sides of an assembled sandwich at the same time as well as making French toast and grilling bacon.

In December, 1931, Elmer Drumm, who had worked at the Mirro Aluminum Company, along with his brother Charles Drumm, Elmer Bleser, and Victor C. Trastek purchased Metal Ware. At the time of the purchase, the company was renamed The Metal Ware Corporation.

In 1936 the Empire line of toy trains was spun off into a separate business named Empire Products Company.  The Metal Ware Corporation continued to manufacture the toys for the new company.  At this time, it was also announced that they obtained a franchise for making Disney character toys from the Silly Symphonies animated short films.

As with many companies at the time, they experienced the effects of the growth of labor unions with the American Federation of Labor announcing that they completely unionized the employees of the Metal Ware Corporation in 1937.

1941-1945 
In April 1942, The Metal Ware Corporation announced that it would have contracts for arms production.

By December 1944, essential consumer goods were in short supply and the War Production Board authorized The Metal Ware Corp to resume production of electrical appliances as materials and labor became available.

In April 1945, because of continued war production, the company began construction of a 2500 s.f. addition to their plant.

For national security reasons, plant production was often not made public until after the war was over.  In 1946, it was reported that The Metal Ware Corporation had been producing electric lanterns for soldiers and electrical appliances for naval ships.

1946-1980 
In 1950, The Metal Ware Corporation bought the assets of the Herah Electric Specialty company in Milwaukee and moved the dies, patterns and materials inventory to its Two Rivers plant.  The Herah company was in the business of manufacturing electric wall heaters, electric fireplace logs, portable heaters, and fluorescent lighting specialties...  They had employed fewer than a dozen people.

Business growth continued to fuel expansion.  An additional 6000 s.f. of warehouse space was construction in 1952.

In the mid 1950s, metal toys continued to be a large part of the company's business making up nearly half of their production with the largest portion of that being it the miniature ranges. Other products produced include toy electric irons with ironing boards, electric trains, various small appliances marketed under the Empire name such as electric corn poppers and Lady Aristette hair dryers.

A major change came to the company in March 1960 with the passing of Elmer O. Drumm who had been president of the company since purchasing it in 1931.  Elmer was succeeded in August by his son Wesley C. Drumm.  He was promoted from the position of General Manager.  He had been associated with the firm since 1947 and had become the sales and advertising manager in 1953.

At the end of 1964, the company reported that sales were up from previous years and had a record year for coffee makers. Continued strong growth for the company was evidenced by construction of a 1400 s.f. office space addition to their main building in 1965. By 1973 an additional office space expansion added another 3200 s.f.

A labor strike by the Aluminum Workers International Union was started on April 2, 1968, over a labor contract that expired On December 31. 1967. Negotiations for a new contract had begun the previous May. The strike lasted three weeks and ended on April 24.  The new contract was to run till the end of 1970.

By the mid 1970s the product line showed a complete shift away from toys and included the Empire line of electric coffee makers and party urns, slow cookers, electric kettles, pop-corn poppers, egg cookers and poachers, hot cups, travel kits, Lady Aristette hair dryers, and the combination Kar 'N Home kits.  The line of metal toys was dropped in the mid 1960s due to increasing federal safety regulations. New products introduced in 1977 included the Little Fry mini deep fryer and the Empire Travl-Mate automatic coffee maker kit.

1981-2014 
The 1980s marked a major change in the growth in the company with a series of acquisitions of related cookware manufacturers.

In 1981, Metal ware Corporation Purchased the NESCO trade name for roaster ovens along with all dies, tooling, equipment, and finished goods inventory from the previous owners.  The roasters were being manufactured in New York, but at one time had been previously manufactured in Wisconsin.

In 1985, Metal Ware purchased MIRRO Outdoor Products and began manufacturing and marketing the Open Country® line of camp cookware and in 1987 bought MAFCO (Monarch Appliance and Fabricating Company), a porcelain finishing and metal stamping facility in Algoma, Wis.

A major boost to the company began in 1991 when the QVC television shopping channel began selling their NESCO roasters on national basis. In addition to large phone sales through QVC, the national exposure expanded their access to other retail stores as customers were asking for the roasters in the stores.  The exposure was also a big help with the launch of a new product, a convection roaster called the Roast-Aire. By 1997 one million units had shipped.

In 1996, it acquired a tabletop cooking grill product line from Algonquin Mercantile Corporation, a small appliance maker in Ontario, Canada, and brought that production into Wisconsin.

In 1997, it acquired a Wisconsin plastics molding company and obtained the assets of Minnesota-based American Harvest, Inc., well known for its food dehydrator. With this addition, the company created a new brand—NESCO®/American Harvest™.

Metal Ware continues to expand its product lines and find new paths to develop markets and build value. The Open Country® collection now includes a Fish Scaler, Jerky Seasonings and cooking accessories for outdoor enthusiasts, and the electrics line contains an array of pressure cookers, Jet-Steam Ovens, bread maker, food grinders and slicers, hand blenders, juicers and coffee products. In developing its coffee bean roaster, Metal Ware developed a unique method to convert the harsh odors typical of this process into the fragrance that draws coffee lovers.

The classic Roaster Oven comes in many sizes and colors. The basic design of the Spa Pro® Massage Stone Heater is based on the roaster over. The current product line includes a coffee blade grinder, coffee roasters, coffee urn, food slicers, food grinders, pressure cookers, juice blenders, water kettles, food steamers, bread machine, waffle maker, toasters, and a portable induction cooktop.

2014-Present 
In 2016, The Metal Ware Corporation merged with Chard International, an outdoor cooking and meat preparation product company, owned by Richard Carey and business partner Ross Niemi.  The merger brought 14 new employees to Metal Ware. Richard Carey took over as President of Metal Ware and Ross Niemi as the COO. 

The Metal Ware Corp is currently expanding, adding new brands and product lines such as Grizzly Docks and DeWALT Coolers. Along with new products, The Metal Ware Corp is also currently working to increase domestic production. To do so, Metal Ware has added three plastic injection molding machines, as well as a new plastic Roto Molding machine increasing production jobs by 50% in the last three years within their six facilities.

Patents and Trademarks 
As is common with many corporations, the Metal Ware Corporation applied for and was granted numerous patents for its products over the course of its existence. It has also become the assignee for patents for companies that it has acquired.

Utility Patents 
 Canteen construction
 Method for Rapidly Cooking Food
 Cooking system and accessories
 Assemblies for Increasing Airflow and Heating Efficiency in a Multi-shelf Food Heading Device
 Food dehydrator
 Food dehydrator and tray for a dehydrator
 Cooking system and accessories
 Rapid cooking device
 Convection oven
 Method for rapidly cooking food
 Rapid cooking device
 Cooking system and accessories
 Automatic bread making machine
 Food dehydrator
 Food Dehydrator
 Electronically controlled roaster oven with digital control assembly
 Coffee bean roasting apparatus

Design Patents 
 Bread slicer
 Convection oven
 Handle for a countertop oven
 Muffin holder
 Convection oven
 Breadmaker
 Extension ring for a convection oven
 Hair braiding device
 Food dehydrator
 Bread pan
 Roaster oven with end caps
 Combined roaster oven with hinged cover

Registered Trademarks 
 NESCO
 MONARCH
 SIERRA
 CLEAN-A-SCREEN
 CONVERGA-FLOW
 ADD-A-TRAY
 OPEN COUNTRY
 SNACKMASTER
 GARDENMASTER
 CYCLONIC COOKING
 WEEKENDER
 JET-STREAM OVEN
 AMERICAN HARVEST
 ROAST AIR OVEN
 ROAST-AIR
 AH AMERICAN HARVEST
 NESCOTE
 CIRCLE OF HEAT
 NESCO
 SNACKMASTER VISION
 NESCO
 OPEN COUNTRY
 OPEN COUNTRY
 GRIP 'N GO
 SPA PRO
 TUMBLE DRUMM
 TUMBLE DRUMM FISH SCALER
 NESCO AH AMERICAN HARVEST

References

External links 
 NESCO
 Open Country Campware

Manitowoc County, Wisconsin
Manufacturing companies based in Wisconsin